Hage is a small East Frisian town in Lower Saxony, Germany.

Hage or Håge may also refer to:

Places
 Hage (Randen), a mountain in the Swiss canton of Schaffhausen
 Hage (Samtgemeinde), a collective municipality in Lower Saxony, Germany, containing the town Hage
 Hage Station, a railway station in Nishitosahage, Shimanto-shi, Kōchi Prefectre, Japan.

People
 Hage Geingob (born 1941), the third President of Namibia
 Alfred Hage (1803–1872), Danish merchant, politician, landowner and philanthropist.
 Brett Hage (born 1974), American politician
 Christopher Friedenreich Hage (1759–1849), Danish merchant on the island of Møn
 Chucrallah-Nabil El-Hage (born 1943), archeparch of the Maronite Catholic church
 Daisy Hage (born 1993), Dutch handball playe
 Douglas Håge (1898–1959), Swedish actor
 Gerhard Häge (1928/29–1970), West German rower
 Ghassan Hage (born 1957), Lebanese-Australian academic
 Gilbert Hage (born 1966), Lebanese photographer
 Heleen Hage (born 1958), Dutch road racing cyclist 
 Jens Friedenreich Hage (1752-1831), Danish merchant and landowner
 Johannes Hage (1842–1923), Danish businessman and philanthropist 
 Letícia Hage (born 1990), Brazilian volleyball player
 Marwan Hage (born 1981), Canadian footballer
 Moussa El-Hage (born 1954), Maronite Catholic archbishop 
 Nour Hage (born 1988), Lebanese fashion designer
 Per Hage (1935-2004), American anthropologist
 Rawi Hage (born 1964), Lebanese-Canadian writer and photographer
 Salma Hage (born 1942), Lebanese author and cook
 Steve Hage (born 1954), Australian rugby league footballer
 Volker Hage (born 1949), German journalist
 Javier El-Hage (fl. 2000s), Bolivian attorney in the U.S.
 Nada El Hage (fl. from 1988), Lebanese poet, writer and journalist
 Wadih el-Hage (born 1960), Lebanese convicted terrorist
 Youhanna Fouad El-Hage (1939-2005), Lebanese archeparch of the Maronite Catholic church

See also

 Hague (disambiguation)
 Hajj (disambiguation)